The Chungcheng Stadium, opened in 1986, is a multi-use stadium in Lingya District, Kaohsiung, Taiwan. It is employed to hold several (athletics) events.

On 20 October 1996, Michael Jackson made a stop at the stadium for his HIStory World Tour playing to a sell out crowd of 35,000 fans.

Transportation
The stadium is accessible within walking distance South from Martial Arts Stadium Station of the Kaohsiung MRT.

See also
 Sports in Taiwan
 List of stadiums in Taiwan

References

1986 establishments in Taiwan
Athletics (track and field) venues in Taiwan
Football venues in Taiwan
Lingya District
Sports venues completed in 1986
Sports venues in Kaohsiung